Stonegard was a Norwegian heavy metal band from Oslo. They have two official releases in the form of full-length CDs, Arrows and From Dusk till Doom. The band has been inactive since October 2008.

History 
The band released their first CD Arrows on Candlelight Records in 2006. They received excellent reviews from national newspapers television and radio in Norway.

When Stonegard was but one of many bands trying to make it, one of their means to promote themselves were through the Norwegian website NRK Urørt which helps unsigned bands, singers and musicians. Their page was quite popular, and it helped them make a name for themselves. The Stonegard page is now taken down, as they are no longer an unsigned band.

Their motto is "Mer metal til folket", which means "More metal to the people". Stonegard is also strongly against drugs.

Several Stonegard music videos have run on the popular Norwegian TV show Svisj and the pay-channel ZTV. From Arrows, the songs "Barricades", "Arrows" and "Hunter" received air time throughout 2005, as did From Dusk till Doom, the title track of their second album, in 2008.

In 2008 the band toured Europe with Enslaved.

Members 
Torgrim Torve – guitar, lead vocals
Ronny Flissundet – guitar, backing vocals
Håvard Gjerde – bass, backing vocals
Erlend Gjerde – drums

Discography 
 Arrows (Candlelight Records, 2005)
 From Dusk till Doom (Bells Go Clang!, 2006) NOR No. 14

References

External links 
Stonegard website
The MySpace page of Stonegard, with sample tracks included (Norwegian)

Norwegian heavy metal musical groups
Musical groups established in 1997
1997 establishments in Norway
Musical groups disestablished in 2008
2008 disestablishments in Norway
Musical groups from Oslo
Candlelight Records artists